Minerva was an Albanian language literary magazine.

Minerva started in 1932 as a biweekly and later was published monthly.  Directed by journalist Nebil Çika, it ceased publication in 1936

History 
Minerva focused mainly on literary critique of fictional books. Its contributors included Tajar Zavalani, Odise Paskali, Ikbale Çika, and Stefan Shundi.  According to Blendi Fevziu, Minerva was best known magazine of modern life of Albania at the time, and had a relevant influence on the cultural life of Albania. 

Minerva published Its first issue was in 1932.  Thirty-eight issues were published until 1936, when publication ceased.

References 

1932 establishments in Albania
Magazines established in 1932
Literary magazines published in Albania
Albanian-language magazines
Mass media in Tirana
Magazines disestablished in 1936